This is a list of zarzuelas of the Spanish composer Miguel Marqués (1843–1918).

List

Notes

References

 
Lists of operas by composer
Lists of compositions by composer